Leo Erik Jean Cornic (born 2 January 2001) is a Norwegian footballer who plays as a  defender for Rosenborg.

Personal life
Cornic's father is French, and he spent some time in his childhood living in France.

References

2001 births
Living people
Footballers from Oslo
Norwegian footballers
Norway youth international footballers
Norwegian people of French descent
Bærum SK players
Grorud IL players
Djurgårdens IF Fotboll players
Norwegian First Division players
Allsvenskan players
Norwegian expatriate footballers
Expatriate footballers in Sweden
Norwegian expatriate sportspeople in Sweden
Association football defenders